This is a list of champions on the game show Countdown. These are players who have won up to eight games and scored enough points to qualify for their series' finals. Here, they were one of eight contestants invited back to compete in a knockout tournament to decide who will become the series champion. This list also includes winners of Champion of Champions tournaments and the winner of Series 33, which was designated a "Supreme Championship".

There was only one full series in 2005 because of Richard Whiteley's death — his final series, Series 53, was recorded before he was hospitalised with pneumonia. Series 54 began four months later on 31 October 2005 and, having started very late in the year, was extended to last until 26 May 2006. Series champions from this series onwards are awarded the Richard Whiteley Memorial Trophy along with the usual prize of the Oxford English Dictionary.

Champions

References 

 Countdown: Spreading The Word (Granada Media, 2001) pp. 219–20, 225
 The Countdown Page Hall of Fame

Champions
Countdown champions
Countdown champions
Countdown champions